The 21st Century Business Herald (also spelled Twenty-first Century Business Herald; abbreviation: 21CBH), is a Chinese business-news daily newspaper published in China. It was officially launched by Shen Hao on January 1, 2001, as part of the Southern Media Group.

Controversies
In September 2014, executives from the 21st Century Business Herald were arrested by Shanghai police, who claimed they were suspected of extortion.

In April 2015, the official website of 21st Century Business Herald, "21st Century Net", was ordered by the media regulator of China to cease operation because of news blackmail, and the newspaper was ordered to rectify. And the Chinese official said that "21st Century Net" and 21st Century Business Herald also had irregularities such as not separating editorial and business operations.

In December 2015, Shen Hao, the publisher of the 21st Century Business Herald, was sentenced to four years in prison for extortion.

References

Daily newspapers published in China
Business newspapers published in China
Publications established in 2001
2001 establishments in China
Mass media in Guangzhou